The Borana is one of the two major subgroups of the Oromo people. They live in the Borena Zone of the Oromia Region and Liben Zone of the Somali Region of Ethiopia, former Northern Frontier District of Northern Kenya,Tana River in the former coast province of Kenya and also in central Somalia. Boranas living in Kenya and Ethiopia speak a dialect of Oromo and those living in central Somalia share a dialect with Dirr communities of Somalia, a language that is closely related to both Borana Language and Somali Language. The Borana people are notable for practicing Gadaa system without interruption especially those residing in the Oromia region of Ethiopia, a larger percentage of Boranas in Liban Zone of Somali region and those in central Somalia were Muslims, where as those living in Borena Zone of Ethiopia and those in Kenya majorly practicing Christian and Islamic religion, but few still hold purely to their culture especially those in Sakhu Constituency of Marsabit County.

Demography and language

The Borana were believed to have originated from Odesa, settled in Egypt during the reign of Firaun that was mentioned in both holy books of Bible and Quran, help in securing the Firaun kingdom, assist in building of Pyramid, accommodated as part of royal families and later left during the disagreement between the Firaun and Israelites. They migrated through Sudan and settled in the present location. 

Through Gadha system, Boranas believed to have conquered and protected their territory named, Dirre, Dirr Liban, Golbo, Wajer, Dibayu, Torban Jia (all original name) till the second world war where they were overpowered by the colonial politics. Since they were semi-nomadic, their population growth did not match with those of their neighbors both in Kenya and Ethiopia, this put them at risk to lose much of their territories.
 

Boranas share the same name with Oromo speaking populations and share same lineage with Dirr communities of Somalia. Boranas bore the Oromo communities and Dirr communities of Somalia and believed that the whole Oromo communities were their children who originated from Borana and Barentu, Dirr communities originated from intermarriages between Borana and Nubians of Somalia. Those in Kenya and Ethiopia speak Borana language that is closely related to Oromo, which is part of the Cushitic branch of the large Afro-Asiatic language family. In the border regions of Ethiopia-Kenya and southwestern Somalia, one estimate places about 1,094,000 people as Boranas. Another estimate in 2019 suggests 874,000 Boranas in Ethiopia, 210,000 in Kenya and 10,000 in Somalia.

Society

Borana Gadaa system- a form of government that is in existence for the last 567 years 

Borana have their own form of an overhaul system for the last 567 years that is recognized by UNESCO as a heritage that needs to be protected. The system covers political, social, economical and spiritual ways of life.

Politically, it has a system of government where the overall leader is God himself and many unknown things are referred as 'Waqa Bekh', a sentence that can be equated to a Supreme Being knows. The second in command who is also the supreme leader of the whole Borana community is referred to as Abagadha. The Abagadha is the overall in charge of all affairs of the Borana community and answerable to the Gumi Gayo (parliament).

Abagadha is anointed at an early age of 1-8 years. The Abagadha and others of his age pass through an education system that will last for forty years after which he will take over the leadership as Abagadha. He and his team will vote from 17 sub-clans of Borana, one parliament member from each sub-clan. The parliament, called Gumi Gayo, functions just like a present day senate with the same roles.

Economically, from those time immemorial up to date Borana have laws that are passed in the Gumi Gayo covering Borana traditional land and natural resources. Since Boranas were mixed farmers rearing cattle, camels, goats and planting food crops; farming land, grazing land, water sources and their traditional boundaries are paramount to them and in many cases fights broke out between Borana and their neighbors who take advantage of Borana kindness and forcefully rear their animals in Borana grazing land and take over some of the Borana water sources, traditionally called Tula Saglan. As of today the Borana boundaries were infiltrated by all three current governments surrounding the Borana territory which include Ethiopia, Kenya and Somalia.

Due to this Borana lost much of their top grazing land far from their central area where they used to take their animals during the drought. They are economically affected and politically caught between these colonial governments and many struggles between them. As of today the nine wells of Borana (Tulla Saglan), traditional settlements and their traditional grazing land are scattered across these colonial boundaries and others are inaccessible to the larger Boranas.

Socially, Boranas were known to be very kind people especially to the visitors, a weakness that all these three colonial governments used to strip off them most of their ancestral heritages not limited to land, water sources, natural resources and top grazing areas. Boranas harmoniously lived with their neighbors through sharing and helping during hard times like prolonged drought seasons, till colonial powers set in and instigated colonial wars and redrew the African territories into colonial boundaries.

Spiritually, Boranas believe that there is a supreme Being in charge of their worldly affairs and upper dominion, they believe that there is a creator called 'WAQ'. Many Borana people prefer to be Muslims rather than Christians since the religion of Islam concurs in many ways with their tradition. Years ago Boranas became Muslims, three time of three consecutive Abagadhas and goes back to fully to their tradition three consecutive Abagadhas after this. Since then their system remains full tradition. But still, there are Boranas who are Muslims and others who are Christians as well and they all value their system as an asset.

Spiritually, Boranas have a supreme spiritual leader known as Fite Qalu. Besides being a supreme spirituality in charge of prayer in all Borana gatherings, including the Borana parliament, he is also in charge of administration, who appoints other Qalu, putting them in charge of smaller administration units, which can be equated to a present state president, a Qalu who in turn appoints other smaller administrators in his jurisdiction called Jalab (governor) who are respectively in charge of smaller administration, meaning one Qalu is in charge of many Jalab under his state. Accordingly, the Jalab appoints Qae (village) in charge of villages under him. Qae is answerable to Jalab, Jalab is answerable to Qalu, and Qalu is answerable to Fite Qalu. Only Fite Qalu and Qalu have an authority to make a prayer in all gatherings, Jalab and Qae are deprived of that role. No Borana gatherings are recognized without the presence of either Fite Qalu or Qalu who opens the gatherings with a prayer.

Boranas also have special warriors that defend the community from any enemies. They are in the last stage to the Gadaa stage and are in one part of stages of Borana system. Only those between 32-40 years are allowed to be part of this special Borana Defense Forces. They are all in an immediate stage to the Gadaa stage called Dori. They serve their community for eight years and meet three times in those years. The first meeting takes place before they depart to different regions of Borana for community protection. The second meeting is after four years. And they meet a last time, again, at the end of their eight years making a ceremony of giving the roles and power of protection to other upcoming members of that age of Dori who were in Raba before. Their time cuts across two consecutive supreme leaders and they serve and take instructions from both.

See also
Oromia
Borena Zone
 Oromo people
Somalis

Notes

References

Further reading
Asmarom Legesse. Gada Three Approaches to the Study of African Society. The Free Press A Division of McMillan Co. Inc, 1973 
Beckingham and G.W.B. Huntingford, Some records of Ethiopia Hakluyt Society, 1954
Bassi Marco, Decisions in the Shade. Political and juridical processes among the Oromo-Borana Red Sea Press, 2005
Clifford H F Plowman CMG OBE, Notes On The Gedamoch Ceremonies Among The Boran,  Journal of the Royal African Society, Vol. 18, No. 70 (Jan 1919), pp. 114–121

 
Oromo groups